Indexes of individual years in Wales.

2020s - 2010s - 2000s - 1990s - 1980s - 1970s - 1960s - 1950s - 1940s - 1930s - 1920s - 1910s - 1900s - 1890s - 1880s - 1870s - 1860s - 1850s - 1840s - 1830s - 1820s - 1810s - 1800s - 1790s - 1780s - 1770s - 1760s - 1750s - 1740s - 1730s - 1720s - 1710s - Pre-1710

2020s  
 2029 in Wales –
 2028 in Wales –
 2027 in Wales –
 2026 in Wales –
 2025 in Wales –
 2024 in Wales –
 2023 in Wales –
 2022 in Wales – 2022 Welsh local elections
 2021 in Wales – 2021 Senedd election
 2020 in Wales – Start of the COVID-19 pandemic in Wales

2010s 
 2019 in Wales – Cardiff City F.C.'s new signing, Emiliano Sala, is killed in a plane crash while returning to Wales from France.
 2018 in Wales – Mark Drakeford replaces Carwyn Jones as First Minister.
 2017 in Wales – June Osborne becomes the first female Bishop of Llandaff.
 2016 in Wales – Ifor ap Glyn replaces Gillian Clarke as the National Poet of Wales.
 2015 in Wales – The ferry service between Dún Laoghaire in Ireland and Holyhead ends after two centuries.
 2014 in Wales – Wales win a record total of 36 medals at the Commonwealth Games in Glasgow. 
 2013 in Wales – A fire at the National Library of Wales causes some damage to the collection.
 2012 in Wales – The Millennium Stadium hosts the opening event of the London Olympics in the football competition, with 11 matches being held in total.
 2011 in Wales – The Welsh devolution referendum, 63.49% vote in favour of the Welsh Assembly able to make laws in areas it has powers for.
 2010 in Wales – Wales hosts golf's Ryder Cup for the first time

2000s 
 2009 in Wales - Carwyn Jones takes over from Rhodri Morgan as First Minister of Wales
 2008 in Wales - Resignation of Peter Hain as Secretary of State for Wales
 2007 in Wales - Introduction of the legal ban on smoking in public places
 2006 in Wales - The Queen opens the new Senedd building in Cardiff 
 2005 in Wales - Cardiff celebrates its centenary as a city (50 years as Welsh capital)
 2004 in Wales - Wales Millennium Centre opens
 2003 in Wales - Michael Howard becomes leader of the UK Conservative Party
 2002 in Wales - Cowbridge businessman Peter Shaw is kidnapped in Georgia, but escapes after five months
 2001 in Wales - Launch of the pressure group Cymuned
 2000 in Wales - Wales child abuse scandal

1990s 
 1999 in Wales - First elections to the National Assembly for Wales
 1998 in Wales - Alun Michael becomes Secretary of State for Wales
 1997 in Wales - Referendum on devolution results in narrow "Yes" vote
 1996 in Wales - Founding of the Owain Glyndwr Society
 1995 in Wales - Disappearance of Richey Edwards
 1994 in Wales - Tower Colliery is bought by its workforce
 1993 in Wales - John Redwood makes an unsuccessful attempt to mime to the Welsh national anthem
 1992 in Wales - Ebbw Vale Garden Festival
 1991 in Wales - Four nights of rioting in Ely, Cardiff
 1990 in Wales - Flooding in Towyn, north Wales

1980s 
 1989 in Wales - The Hippocratic oath is taken in Welsh for the first time
 1988 in Wales - Steve Jones wins the New York Marathon
 1987 in Wales - Ieuan Wyn Jones wins Ynys Môn
 1986 in Wales - First Welsh Proms
 1985 in Wales - The campaigning group Cefn is founded
 1984 in Wales - Beginning of the miners' strike
 1983 in Wales - Neil Kinnock becomes leader of the UK Labour Party
 1982 in Wales - 32 Welsh Guardsmen are killed on Sir Galahad in the Falklands War
 1981 in Wales - Charles, Prince of Wales marries Lady Diana Spencer
 1980 in Wales - Campaigners force the government to honour its promise of a Welsh language fourth television channel

1970s 
 1979 in Wales - The Saint David's Day devolution referendum rejects the idea of a Welsh Assembly by four to one 
 1978 in Wales - Death of Sir Clough Williams-Ellis
 1977 in Wales - Johnny Owen wins the British bantamweight boxing championship
 1976 in Wales - InterCity 125 high-speed trains begin running between Swansea and Paddington
 1975 in Wales - Opening of the Cleddau Bridge
 1974 in Wales - Berwyn Mountain Incident
 1973 in Wales - Completion of the Llyn Brianne dam
 1972 in Wales - The Local Government Act 1972 transforms Wales into eight counties.
 1971 in Wales - Ryan Davies and Ronnie Williams become household names when their show is transferred to BBC1 
 1970 in Wales - Bernice Rubens wins the Booker Prize

1960s 
 1969 in Wales - Investiture of Charles, Prince of Wales
 1968 in Wales - First bilingual postage stamp
 1967 in Wales - Welsh Language Act 1967
 1966 in Wales - Aberfan disaster
 1965 in Wales - Bryn Terfel born
 1964 in Wales - The Welsh Office is established
 1963 in Wales - First protest by Cymdeithas yr Iaith Gymraeg
 1962 in Wales - Opening of Llanwern steelworks
 1961 in Wales - Atlantic College founded
 1960 in Wales - Ricky Valance becomes the first male Welsh singer to reach no.1 in the charts

1950s 
 1959 in Wales - Welsh flag given official status
 1958 in Wales - Last execution in Wales
 1957 in Wales - Passing of the Tryweryn Bill
 1956 in Wales - First Welsh-medium secondary school 
 1955 in Wales - Cardiff becomes official capital
 1954 in Wales - Opening of Cardiff Wales Airport
 1953 in Wales - Queen Elizabeth II makes her first official visit to Wales as queen
 1952 in Wales - Wenvoe television transmitter comes into service
 1951 in Wales - Death of Ivor Novello
 1950 in Wales - Dylan Thomas makes his first visit to America

1940s 
 1949 in Wales - Dylan Thomas settles at the Boat House in Laugharne.
 1948 in Wales - Aneurin Bevan brings in the Acts of Parliament that create the welfare state
 1947 in Wales - Wreck of the Samtampa
 1946 in Wales - Coal Industry Nationalisation Act 
 1945 in Wales - Lloyd George is created an earl
 1944 in Wales - Grace Williams writes Sea Sketches
 1943 in Wales - Welsh National Opera is founded
 1942 in Wales - Welsh Courts Act
 1941 in Wales - How Green Was My Valley is filmed
 1940 in Wales - The song We'll Keep a Welcome is first performed

1930s 
 1939 in Wales - The first wartime evacuees arrive in Wales
 1938 in Wales - The Temple of Peace is opened in Cathays Park, Cardiff
 1937 in Wales - Tommy Farr fights Joe Louis
 1936 in Wales - Saunders Lewis and others are imprisoned for their sabotage attack on Penrhos aerodrome
 1935 in Wales - Felinfoel Brewery starts selling canned beer
 1934 in Wales - 265 miners are killed in the Gresford mining accident
 1933 in Wales - Amy Johnson takes off from Pendine
 1932 in Wales - Frank Brangwyn completes the Empire Panels
 1931 in Wales - The Welsh School of Medicine is founded
 1930 in Wales - The first youth hostel opens at Pennant Hall in the Conwy Valley

1920s 
 1929 in Wales - Megan Lloyd George becomes Wales's first female MP
 1928 in Wales - Amelia Earhart lands in Wales after flying the Atlantic
 1927 in Wales - Coleg Harlech is founded
 1926 in Wales - Miners' strike leads to General Strike
 1925 in Wales - Llyn Eigiau dam bursts, killing 16 people
 1924 in Wales - Claude Friese-Greene travels through Wales
 1923 in Wales - The Diocese of Swansea and Brecon is created
 1922 in Wales - Urdd Gobaith Cymru is founded
 1921 in Wales - The UK's first oil refinery opens at Llandarcy
 1920 in Wales - Death of Sir Owen Morgan Edwards

1910s 
 1919 in Wales - Kinmel Park Riots
 1918 in Wales - First woman parliamentary candidate in Wales
 1917 in Wales - Death of Hedd Wyn
 1916 in Wales - 38th (Welsh) Division in action at Mametz Wood
 1915 in Wales - Publication of My People by Caradoc Evans
 1914 in Wales - Welsh Home Rule Bill fails
 1913 in Wales - 439 men killed at Senghenydd in the worst disaster in British mining history
 1912 in Wales - National miners' strike
 1911 in Wales - Investiture of the future Edward VIII of the United Kingdom as Prince of Wales
 1910 in Wales - First general election in which all Welsh constituencies are contested

1900s
 1909 in Wales - Record British monthly rainfall of 56.5 inches at Llyn Llydaw, Snowdonia
 1908 in Wales - Strumble Head lighthouse built
 1907 in Wales - King Edward VII lays foundation of Bangor University
 1906 in Wales - no Conservative MPs in Wales
 1905 in Wales - David Lloyd George joins the Cabinet
 1904 in Wales - start of 1904-1905 Welsh Revival
 1903 in Wales - Death of Dr Joseph Parry
 1902 in Wales - Opening of Great Orme tramway
 1901 in Wales - Prince George and Princess Mary become Prince and Princess of Wales
 1900 in Wales - Keir Hardie becomes first Labour MP

1890s
 1899 in Wales - First gramophone recording in the Welsh language
 1898 in Wales - Peak year of slate production in Wales
 1897 in Wales - Marconi makes the first radio transmission from Lavernock Point
 1896 in Wales - Opening of the Snowdon Mountain Railway
 1895 in Wales - Welsh Grand National held for the first time
 1894 in Wales - 290 men killed in a mining disaster at Albion Colliery, Cilfynydd
 1893 in Wales - Wales win the Triple Crown for the first time
 1892 in Wales - The South Wales Argus is launched
 1891 in Wales - Birth of Kate Roberts
 1890 in Wales - David Lloyd George becomes MP for Caernarfon

1880s
 1889 in Wales - Opening of Barry docks
 1888 in Wales - Welsh Parliamentary Liberal Party is formed
 1887 in Wales - Wreck of the Helvetia
 1886 in Wales - Opening of Severn rail tunnel
 1885 in Wales - Frances Hoggan is first woman doctor registered in Wales. 
 1884 in Wales - Opening of University of Wales, Bangor 
 1883 in Wales - Treorchy Male Voice Choir formed. 
 1882 in Wales - SA Brain & Company Ltd opens its brewery in Cardiff. 
 1881 in Wales - River Vyrnwy is dammed to create Lake Vyrnwy. 
 1880 in Wales - First "official" National Eisteddfod held at Caernarfon

1870s
 1879 in Wales - Defence of Rorke's Drift by 139 South Wales Borderers 
 1878 in Wales - Gilchrist-Thomas method of steelmaking developed at Blaenavon; Prince of Wales Colliery disaster at Abercarn
 1877 in Wales - First soccer Welsh Cup
 1876 in Wales - Cardiff RFC plays its first match
 1875 in Wales - Mining disasters at New Tredegar and Pentyrch
 1874 in Wales - Opening of Powysland Museum, Welshpool 
 1873 in Wales - Work begins on the Severn rail tunnel
 1872 in Wales - University of Wales, Aberystwyth, is founded
 1871 in Wales - Miners' strike in South Wales 
 1870 in Wales - Francis Kilvert begins his diary

1860s

 1869 in Wales
 1868 in Wales
 1867 in Wales
 1866 in Wales
 1865 in Wales
 1864 in Wales
 1863 in Wales
 1862 in Wales
 1861 in Wales
 1860 in Wales

1850s

 1859 in Wales
 1858 in Wales
 1857 in Wales
 1856 in Wales
 1855 in Wales
 1854 in Wales
 1853 in Wales
 1852 in Wales
 1851 in Wales
 1850 in Wales

1840s

 1849 in Wales
 1848 in Wales
 1847 in Wales
 1846 in Wales
 1845 in Wales
 1844 in Wales
 1843 in Wales
 1842 in Wales
 1841 in Wales
 1840 in Wales

1830s

 1839 in Wales
 1838 in Wales
 1837 in Wales
 1836 in Wales
 1835 in Wales
 1834 in Wales
 1833 in Wales
 1832 in Wales
 1831 in Wales
 1830 in Wales

1820s

 1829 in Wales
 1828 in Wales
 1827 in Wales
 1826 in Wales
 1825 in Wales
 1824 in Wales
 1823 in Wales
 1822 in Wales
 1821 in Wales
 1820 in Wales

1810s

 1819 in Wales
 1818 in Wales
 1817 in Wales
 1816 in Wales
 1815 in Wales
 1814 in Wales
 1813 in Wales
 1812 in Wales
 1811 in Wales
 1810 in Wales

1800s

 1809 in Wales
 1808 in Wales
 1807 in Wales
 1806 in Wales
 1805 in Wales
 1804 in Wales
 1803 in Wales
 1802 in Wales
 1801 in Wales
 1800 in Wales

1790s

 1799 in Wales
 1798 in Wales
 1797 in Wales
 1796 in Wales
 1795 in Wales
 1794 in Wales
 1793 in Wales
 1792 in Wales
 1791 in Wales
 1790 in Wales

1780s

 1789 in Wales
 1788 in Wales
 1787 in Wales
 1786 in Wales
 1785 in Wales
 1784 in Wales
 1783 in Wales
 1782 in Wales
 1781 in Wales
 1780 in Wales

1770s

 1779 in Wales
 1778 in Wales
 1777 in Wales
 1776 in Wales
 1775 in Wales
 1774 in Wales
 1773 in Wales
 1772 in Wales
 1771 in Wales
 1770 in Wales

1760s

 1769 in Wales
 1768 in Wales
 1767 in Wales
 1766 in Wales
 1765 in Wales
 1764 in Wales
 1763 in Wales
 1762 in Wales
 1761 in Wales
 1760 in Wales

1750s

 1759 in Wales
 1758 in Wales
 1757 in Wales
 1756 in Wales
 1755 in Wales
 1754 in Wales
 1753 in Wales
 1752 in Wales
 1751 in Wales
 1750 in Wales

1740s

1749 in Wales
1748 in Wales
1747 in Wales
1746 in Wales
1745 in Wales
1744 in Wales
1743 in Wales
1742 in Wales
1741 in Wales
1740 in Wales

1730s

1739 in Wales
1738 in Wales
1737 in Wales
1736 in Wales
1735 in Wales
1734 in Wales
1733 in Wales
1732 in Wales
1731 in Wales
1730 in Wales

1720s

1729 in Wales
1728 in Wales
1727 in Wales
1726 in Wales
1725 in Wales
1724 in Wales
1723 in Wales
1722 in Wales
1721 in Wales
1720 in Wales

1710s

1719 in Wales
1718 in Wales
1717 in Wales
1716 in Wales
1715 in Wales
1714 in Wales
1713 in Wales
1712 in Wales
1711 in Wales
1710 in Wales

Pre-1710
 1700s in Wales
 17th century in Wales
 16th century in Wales
 15th century in Wales
 14th century in Wales
 13th century in Wales
 12th century in Wales
 11th century in Wales
 10th century in Wales
 9th century in Wales

See also
List of years in the United Kingdom
List of years in England
List of years in Northern Ireland
List of years in Scotland
Timeline of Welsh history

Further reading
Breverton, Terry - The Welsh Almanack (Wales Books, 2003)
Fisher, Deborah C. - Who's Who in Welsh History (Christopher Davies, 1997)
May, John - Reference Wales (University of Wales Press, 1994)

Years in Wales